Rosalyn "Roz" Bulmer (born 4 May 1979 from Norwich) is an English darts player, who currently plays in British Darts Organisation events. She qualified for the 2019 BDO World Darts Championship.

Career
In 2018, Bulmer qualified for the 2019 BDO World Darts Championship as after the year's performances saw her placed 12th on the rankings. She was defeated by Sharon Prins in the first round.

World Championship results

BDO
 2019: First Round (lost to Sharon Prins 0–2) (sets)

Personal life
Bulmer is married to Jason Lovett, a professional darts player from Norfolk.

External links
 Roz Bulmer's profile and stats on Darts Database

References

Living people
English darts players
1979 births
Female darts players
British Darts Organisation players
Sportspeople from Norwich